Pero is a comune (municipality) in the Province of Milan in the Italian region Lombardy, located about  northwest of Milan.

The municipality of Pero contains the frazioni (subdivisions, mainly villages and hamlets) Cerchiate and Cerchiarello.

Pero borders the following municipalities: Rho, Milan.

Pero is linked to Milan and Rho by the underground line M1 (a.k.a. "red line").

Demographic evolution

Twin towns
Pero is twinned with:

  Fuscaldo, Italy

References

External links
 www.comune.pero.mi.it/